Jim Peebles (1931–2013) was an Australian rugby league footballer who played in the 1950s and 1960s.

Playing career
Peebles was a local Manly-Warringah player from Queenscliff, New South Wales. Graded at Manly in 1953, he played five seasons of first grade with Manly between 1953 and 1961. Peebles played lock in the 1959 Grand Final with great Manly players such as Rex Mossop, Roy Bull and Ron Willey. He retired in 1962.

Death
Peebles died on 9 February 2013, aged 81.

References

1931 births
2013 deaths
Manly Warringah Sea Eagles players
Australian rugby league players
Rugby league locks
Rugby league players from Sydney